William Selby was a composer.

William Selby may also refer to:
William Selby (died c.1426), MP for City of York
William Selby (died 1612), MP for Berwick-upon-Tweed
William Selby (died 1613), MP for Newcastle-upon-Tyne (UK Parliament constituency)
William Selby (died 1638), MP for Northumberland
William Selby (died 1649), MP for Northumberland (UK Parliament constituency)
William Selby (cricketer) (died 1892), English cricketer
Bill Selby (born 1970), American baseball player
Various members of the English Selby family

See also